Boy Krazy is the self-titled debut of girl group Boy Krazy. This was the only album the group made. It was produced by Mike Stock and Pete Waterman, except "That's What Love Can Do" and "Good Times with Bad Boys", which are a Stock Aitken & Waterman production. Each member sings the lead vocals on at least two songs on the album. 

The album includes their biggest hit "That's What Love Can Do", as well as the singles "All You Have to Do" and "Good Times With Bad Boys". A planned fourth single, "Love is a Freaky Thing", was never released as Johnna Cummings left the band in late 1993.

The album was released in North America first, and then through Europe and Asia. The American releases feature a guitar-driven version of the album track "On a Wing and a Prayer", whereas the European and Asian releases feature a mix more similar to Stock, Aitken & Waterman's typical Europop. Two of the tracks on the album, "That Kinda Love" and "Love Is a Freaky Thing", had been previously recorded by R&B group The Cool Notes, who worked with Stock & Waterman in 1991, but their versions were never released at the time. The latter was released through iTunes in 2009.

In August 2009, Boy Krazy's back catalogue was reissued through iTunes, including three songs recorded for the album but never released: "Exception to the Rule", "I'll Never Get Another Chance Like This", and "Don't Wanna Let You Go". Also issued were a host of unreleased remixes, including commissioned mixes for the never released fourth single "Love Is a Freaky Thing".

Track listing 
All songs written by Stock/Aitken/Waterman, except tracks 2, 4, 7 and 8 (Stock/Waterman).
"That's What Love Can Do" (1993 Radio Mix) (3:22) (Lead vocals: Johnna Cummings)
"That Kinda Love" (3:10) (Lead vocals: Kimberly Blake)
"On a Wing and a Prayer" (3:43) (Lead vocals: Kimberly Blake)
"Different Class" (3:14) (Lead vocals: Josselyne Jones and Kimberly Blake)
"Good Times with Bad Boys" (3:10) (Lead vocals: Kimberly Blake and Johnna Cummings)
"Just Like a Dream Come True" (3:28) (Lead vocals: Ruth Ann Roberts)
"Love Is a Freaky Thing" (3:27) (Lead vocals: Josselyne Jones)
"All You Have to Do" (3:12) (Lead vocals: Johnna Cummings, additional vocals: Josselyne Jones, Kimberly Blake and Ruth Ann Roberts)
"One Thing Leads to Another" (1993 version) (3:12) (Lead vocals: Johnna Cummings, Kimberly Blake, Ruth Ann Roberts and Josselyne Jones)
"Who Could Ask for Anything More" (3:11) (Lead vocals: Ruth Ann Roberts)

Track listing (cherry pop CD re-release) 
Released 20/09/10

"That's What Love Can Do" (1991 Single Mix) (3:15) (Lead vocals: Johnna Cummings)
"That Kinda Love" (3:10) (Lead vocals: Kimberly Blake)
"On A Wing and a Prayer" (European Version) (3:55) (Lead vocals: Kimberly Blake)
"Different Class" (Alternative Mix) (3:45) (Lead vocals: Josselyne Jones and Kimberly Blake)
"Good Times with Bad Boys" (3:10) (Lead vocals: Kimberly Blake and Johnna Cummings)
"Just Like a Dream Come True" (3:28) (Lead vocals: Ruth Ann Roberts)
"Love Is a Freaky Thing" (3:27) (Lead vocals: Josselyne Jones)
"All You Have to Do" (3:12) (Lead vocals: Johnna Cummings, additional vocals: Josselyne Jones, Kimberly Blake and Ruth Ann Roberts)
"One Thing Leads to Another" (1993 version) (3:12) (Lead vocals: Johnna Cummings, Kimberly Blake, Ruth Ann Roberts and Josselyne Jones)
"Who Could Ask for Anything More?" (3:11) (Lead vocals: Ruth Ann Roberts)
"Exception to the Rule" (2:57) (Lead vocals: Josselyne Jones and Kimberly Blake)
"I'll Never Get Another Chance Like This" (2:56) (Lead vocals: Ruth Ann Roberts)
"That's What Love Can Do (Extended Version) (7:13) (Lead vocals: Johnna Cummings)
"All You Have to Do (Extended Version) (7:22) (Lead vocals: Johnna Cummings, additional vocals: Josselyne Jones, Kimberly Blake and Ruth Ann Roberts)
"Good Times with Bad Boys (Dave Ford 12" Mix) (5:04) (Lead vocals: Kimberly Blake and Johnna Cummings)
"Love Is a Freaky Thing (Lurve Dog 12" Mix) (4:31) (Lead vocals: Josselyne Jones)
"On A Wing and a Prayer (Original Mix - USA Version) (3:46) (Lead vocals: Kimberly Blake)
"Just Like a Dream Come True (Original Mix) (3:27) (Lead vocals: Ruth Ann Roberts)
"Who Could Ask for Anything More? (Original Version) (3:10) (Lead vocals: Renée Veneziale)
"That's What Love Can Do (Original Mix) (3:27) (Lead vocals: Johnna Cummings)

References

1993 debut albums
Albums produced by Stock Aitken Waterman
London Records albums